James R. Broach is an American biochemist and molecular biologist currently at Pennsylvania State University and is an Elected Fellow of the American Association for the Advancement of Science and American Academy of Microbiology.

References

Pennsylvania State University faculty
American molecular biologists
Living people
Year of birth missing (living people)